Devario peninsulae is a freshwater fish endemic to Thailand.

References

Fish of Thailand
Fish described in 1945
Devario